Forced convection is type of heat transport in which fluid motion is generated by an external source like a (pump, fan, suction device, etc.). Heat transfer through porus media is very effective and efficiently. Forced convection heat transfer in a confined porous medium has been a subject of intensive studies during the last decades because of its wide applications.

The basic problem in heat convection through porous media consists of predicting the heat transfer rate between a deferentially heated, solid impermeable surface and a fluid-saturated porous medium. Beginning with constant wall temperature.

In 2D steady state system

According to Darcy's law

                             

Balancing the energy equation between enthalpy flow in the x direction and thermal diffusion in the y direction

boundary is slender so     

The Peclet number is a dimensionless number used in calculations involving convective heat transfer. It is the ratio of the thermal energy convected to the fluid to the thermal energy conducted within the fluid.

     Advective transport rate  Diffusive transport rate

See also
 Darcy's law
 Nusselt Number
 Porous media
 Convective heat transfer
 Heat transfer coefficient
 Porous media

References

External links
 https://web.archive.org/web/20091211060057/http://www.me.ust.hk/~mezhao/pdf/20.PDF

Convection
Dimensionless numbers of fluid mechanics
Fluid dynamics
Heat transfer